Queensmill School is a co-educational special school for autistic children operating in London, England. The School is at 1 Askham Road, Shepherd's Bush. This school was rated Inadequate by Ofsted in March 2022, following an inspection on 16 and 17 November 2021. Leadership and Management were also rated to be Inadequate. Ofsted stated arrangements for safeguarding were not effective and record keeping systems particularly around changes in pupils behaviour were weak. Policies around the administration of medication were also not working in practice.

Previously a community school administered by Hammersmith and Fulham London Borough Council, in June 2021 Queensmill School converted to academy status. The school is now sponsored by Queen Charlotte Education Special Trust.

Notable former pupils
Stephen Wiltshire, artist

References

External links
School Website

Special schools in the London Borough of Hammersmith and Fulham
Academies in the London Borough of Hammersmith and Fulham